Kapito is a surname. Notable people with this surname include:

 Fletcher Kapito (born 1959), Malawian boxer
 Robert S. Kapito (born 1957), American businessman and investor

See also
 Capito (disambiguation)